Adra Machan Visilu (English: Dude, blow the whistle) is a 2016 Indian Tamil comedy film directed by Thiraivannan, starring Shiva, Srinivasan and Naina Sarwar in the lead roles. The music was composed by N. R. Raghunanthan.

Cast

 Shiva as Simmakkal Shekar 
 Naina Sarwar as Devi
 Srinivasan as Power Star (Muniyandi)
 Arun Balaji as Goripalayam Rahmath
 Sentrayan
 Singamuthu
 Mansoor Ali Khan
 Raj Kapoor
 K. Selva Bharathy
 T. P. Gajendran
 K. P. Jagan
 Velmurugan
 Jangiri Madhumitha
 Ambani Shankar

Production
The project was first reported in the media during June 2015, with reports stating that Powerstar Srinivasan would feature in a film titled Naanum Herodhaan which would tell the story of an actor forced to repay his fans for their losses during the film distribution process. The concept was considered to be a satire on the issue faced by Rajinikanth following the failure of Lingaa (2014) at the box office. The film began production during the final quarter of 2015 and the shoot progressed at the AVM Studios later under the tentative title of Simmakkal Sekhar.

Release
The film opened in July 2016 to negative reviews. The critic from The Hindu stated "the filmmaking is shocking" and concluded that the film was "excruciating", while The New Indian Express stated "crude and loud with the message on your face, the film is clearly meant for the lowest denominator in the audience".

Soundtrack

N. R. Raghunanthan composed the songs and background music for the film.

References

External links 
 

2016 films
2010s Tamil-language films
Indian comedy films